If I Were You (Transfiguration of man and woman) is a 2012 Chinese romantic comedy film directed and written by Li Qi, starring Jimmy Lin, Yao Di, and Wu Ma. The film was released in China on Chinese New Year. The film is based on Biànshēn nánnǚ, a romantic novel of the same name, by the popular youth author Zi Yue.

Cast
 Jimmy Lin as Shan Min, a stamen man and rich second generation who works at the Zhejiang Music Radio Station.
 Yao Di as Xiao Ai, an orphan longing for love.
 Wu Ma as the old man, who is an inventor. He invents a magic umbrella, which causes Shan Min and Xiao Ai to switch bodies.

Other
 Xu Dexin as the fat man, who is Shan Min's best friend.
 Xu Songzi as Shan Min's mother.
 Wulan Xinzi as Shan Min's former girlfriend.
 Tanya as Shan Min's lover.
 Yang Di

Release
The film premiered in China on 26 January 2012.

References

External links
 
 

Chinese romantic comedy films
Films based on Chinese novels
2010s Mandarin-language films